Radio Freedom also called Radio Zambia was a South African radio arm of the African National Congress (ANC) and its fighting wing Umkhonto we Sizwe (MK) (Spear of the Nation) during the anti-Apartheid struggle from the 1970s through the 1990s. It was the oldest liberation radio station in Africa. Listening to Radio Freedom in Apartheid-era South Africa was a crime carrying a penalty of up to eight years in prison.

Its first formal broadcast aired in June 1963. The activist and ANC member Walter Sisulu announced the new station, saying "I come to you from somewhere in South Africa... Never has the country, and our people, needed leadership as they do now, in this hour of crisis. Our house is on fire.” By the mid-1970s, having been exiled, Radio Freedom was broadcasting on radio stations in five different countries (Tanzania, Zambia, Angola, Ethiopia, and Madagascar).

In 1983, South African soldiers targeted and destroyed Radio Freedom's Madagascar facility, halting its operation for a short time.

Station identifications featured machine-gun fire, followed by spoken words such as "This is Radio Freedom, the voice of the African National Congress and its military wing uMkhonto we Sizwe", or a variation of that. These identifications became familiar to international audiences after an excerpt from one was included in a hit song "3 a.m. Eternal", first released in 1989, by The KLF.

Like other guerrilla stations, Radio Freedom shared news, interviews, poetry and commentary from the movement that ran counter to the highly censored media reports from within South Africa. Regular reports on bombings and acts of sabotage by the MK gave the impression of a nearly continuous assault and encouraged listeners to join the movement.

For some listeners, Radio Freedom's most valued contribution was the music, as it was the only place where one could hear exiled South African musicians like Dollar Brand (Abdullah Ibrahim), Dudu Pukwana, Miriam Makeba, or any music critical of apartheid. Much like tuning into Radio Freedom could come with a prison sentence, so too did owning a record of these artists; possessing a Miriam Makeba record, for instance, could lead to five years in prison.

In 1991, as apartheid came to an end, so too did Radio Freedom. The ANC, which had already shifted priorities from seizing power to gaining a seat at the table, convinced the new government to release political prisoners and welcome exiles back to South Africa. With broadcasters lining up to return home, the station slipped off the air without fanfare.     

Winnie Mandela and several people featured in Amandla!: A Revolution in Four-Part Harmony credit Radio Freedom as a significant comforting, rallying, and organising factor in the fight against Apartheid.

References

External links
 African History on the Internet - Colonial Period

Community radio stations in South Africa
Defunct radio stations in South Africa
Anti-Apartheid organisations
Pirate radio stations
History of the African National Congress
Radio stations established in 1963
Radio stations disestablished in 1991
Defunct mass media in Ethiopia